Local elections were held in the United Kingdom in 1985. The projected share of the vote was Labour 39%, Conservative 32%, Liberal-SDP Alliance 26%. Labour had the largest share of the vote in local council elections for the first time since 1981.

Both Conservatives and Labour lost some seats to the Liberal-SDP Alliance, who were rebuilding under the leadership of David Owen and enjoying strong showings (including a brief lead) in the opinion polls.

The overall results were as follows;

Conservative losses: 202
Number of Conservative councillors: 10,191

Labour losses: 124
Number of Labour councillors: 8,746

Liberal-SDP Alliance gains: 302
Number of Liberal-SDP Alliance councillors: 2,633

Summary of results

Alan Clark, writing in his diary for 11 May 1985, shortly after the election, stated:
"Some stupid prick has done a 'projection' in one of the heavies showing that the SDP will have a massive overall majority in the House of Commons.."

England

Non-metropolitan county councils

‡ New electoral division boundaries

Sui generis

Northern Ireland

Wales

County councils

References

External links
Local elections 2006. House of Commons Library Research Paper 06/26.
Vote 2001 BBC News